Gustav Metzger (10 April 1926, Nuremberg – 1 March 2017, London) was a German artist and political activist who developed the concept of Auto-Destructive Art and the Art Strike. 
Together with John Sharkey, he initiated the Destruction in Art Symposium in 1966. 
Metzger was recognised for his protests in the political and artistic realms.

Early life and education

Metzger was born to Polish Jewish parents in Nuremberg, Germany, in 1926 and came to Britain in 1939 as a refugee under the auspices of the Refugee Children Movement. He lost his Polish citizenship and was stateless since the late 1940s. He received a grant from the UK Jewish community to study at the Royal Academy of Fine Arts in Antwerp between 1948 and 1949. It is with an experience of twentieth century society's destructive capabilities that led Metzger to a concentrated 'formulation of what destruction is and what it might be in relation to art.'

Metzger became a vegetarian in 1944 and remained a strong advocate of vegetarianism throughout his life. He was among the first to take a stand against environmental pollution and nuclear proliferation.

Career
His experience of twentieth century society's destructive capabilities led Metzger to a concentrated 'formulation of what destruction is and what it might be in relation to art.'  He was known as a leading exponent of the Auto-Destructive Art and the Art Strike movements. He was also active in the Committee of 100 -  a 'named' member

In 1959, Metzger published the first auto-destructive manifesto Auto-Destructive Art. This was given as a lecture to the Architectural Association School of Architecture (AA) in 1964, which was taken over by students as an artistic 'Happening'. The Architectural Association published, in 2015, a facsimile edition of Metzger's lecture transcript. In 1962 he participated in the Festival of Misfits organised by members of the Fluxus group, at Gallery One, London. Guitarist Pete Townshend from The Who studied with Metzger, and during the 1960s, Metzger's work was projected on screens at The Who concerts. Metzger also worked with Cream, providing them with light shows in the 1960s.

In 2005, he selected EASTinternational which he proclaimed to be "The art exhibition without the art."

Throughout the 60 years that Metzger produced politically engaged works, he incorporated materials ranging from trash to old newspapers, liquid crystals to industrial materials, and even acid."

From 29 September to 8 November 2009, the Serpentine Gallery featured the most extensive exhibition in the UK of his work. Exhibits included the installation Flailing Trees, 15 upturned willow trees embedded in a block of concrete, symbolising a world turned upside down by global warming. He felt that artists are especially threatened, because so many rely on nature as a big inspiration. Metzger stated that "artists have a special part to play in opposing extinction, if only on a theoretical, intellectual basis."

Metzger was a non-smoker and teetotaller who did not drink coffee or English tea. He carried around his own supply of green tea and was described as a vegan in his later years. He lived and worked in East London.

Works

Public Demonstration of Auto-Destructive Art
This was originally made in 1960 and remade as Recreation of First Public Demonstration of Auto-Destructive Art in 2004.

Demonstration at the South Bank, London, 1961

Acid action painting

Construction with glass

Liquid Crystal Environment
Liquid Crystal Environment was originally made in 1965 and remade in 2005.

Historic Photographs
This ongoing series of work consists of enlarged press photographs of catastrophic events of the 20th century presented to the viewer using confrontational and experiential methods.

Recreation of First Public Demonstration of Auto-Destructive Art
This was a recreation of the original demonstration made in 1960.
An integral piece of the installation at the Tate Britain, a bag containing rubbish, was erroneously disposed by a cleaner on 30 June 2004. Metzger declared the piece ruined and created a new bag as a replacement.

Flailing Trees
Originally conceived for Manchester Peace Garden and commissioned by Manchester International Festival in 2009, this work consists of uprooted trees inverted into a concrete block in a powerful environmental memorandum of man's destructive capabilities and violation of Nature.

Influences
The painter David Bomberg, the leading light of the Borough Group, taught Metzger and was influential in his development. Metzger was also influenced by the artwork of Johannes Vermeer and the naturopathy of Edmond Szekely.

Death
Metzger died at the age of 90 at his home in London on 1 March 2017. He is buried on the east side of Highgate Cemetery.

Legacy
When Metzger was lecturing at Ealing Art College, one of his students was rock musician Pete Townshend, who later cited Metzger's concepts as an influence for his famous guitar-smashing during performances of The Who. He has also influenced the self-eating computer virus works by the digital artist Joseph Nechvatal.

Further reading
 Metzger, Gustav, Writings (1953–2016), edited by Mathieu Copeland, JRP Editions, 2019, .
 Metzger, Gustav Act or Perish! – A Retrospective. Nero, 2016, .
 Metzger, Gustav Auto-Destructive Art: Metzger at AA, Architectural Association, 2015, .
 Metzger, Gustav, Auto-creative Art, edited by Mathieu Copeland, 2013,  
 Voids A Retrospective, Edited by Mathieu Copeland with John Armleder, Laurent Le Bon, Gustav Metzger, Mai-Thu Perret, Clive Phillpot, Philippe Pirotte. JRP Editions, 2009,  
 Stiles, Kristine, Synopsis of the Destruction in Art Symposium (DIAS) and Its Theoretical Significance. The Act 1 (Spring 1987), pp. 22–31.
 Stiles, Kristine, Thresholds of Control: Destruction Art and Terminal Culture. Out of Control. Edited by Gottfried Hattinger and Karl Gerbel, Linz, Austria: Ars Electronica & Landesverlag, 1991, pp. 29–50.
 Stiles, Kristine, Survival Ethos and Destruction Art. Discourse: Journal for Theoretical Studies in Media and Culture 14:2 (Spring 1992), pp. 74–102; reprinted in Kristine Stiles, Concerning Consequences: Studies in Art, Destruction, and Trauma. Chicago: University of Chicago Press, 2016.
 Stiles, Kristine, Uncorrupted Joy: International Art Actions. In Out of Actions: Between Performance and The Object 1949-1979. Edited by Russell Ferguson and Paul Schimmel, pp. 226–328. 
 Stiles, Kristine, The Story of the Destruction in Art Symposium and the ‘DIAS Affect’. Gustav Metzger. Geschichte Geschichte (History History). Edited by Sabina Breitwieser, 41-65. Vienna and Ostfildern-Ruit: Generali Foundation and Hatje Cantz Verlag, 2005, pp. 41–65.
 Stiles, Kristine, Metzger’s Fierce, Poignant, and Prescient Manifestos. Rett Kopi Documents the Future. Edited by Rett Kopi. (Oslo, Norway: Rett Kopi), pp. 157–166.
 Stiles, Kristine, Introduction to the Destruction in Art Symposium: DIAS and Discussion with Ivor Davies. Link 52 (September 1987), pp. 4–10.
Anna-Verena Nosthoff, "Art After Auschwitz: Responding to an Infinite Demand: Gustav Metzger’s Works as Responses to Theodor W. Adorno’s “New Categorical Imperative”." Cultural Politics 10 (3): 300–319. (Duke University Press)

See also
 Anti-art
 Destruction in Art Symposium

References

External links

Radical Art, Gustav Metzger
UCSB Department of English Course Materials: Gustav Metzger

1926 births
2017 deaths
Burials at Highgate Cemetery
Artists from Nuremberg
Fluxus
Stateless people
Postmodern artists
British conceptual artists
Contemporary painters
Kindertransport refugees
Polish expatriates in Germany
20th-century Polish Jews
Borough Group
Jewish activists
British anti–nuclear weapons activists
British contemporary artists
Polish emigrants to the United Kingdom